Hong Kong 47 are the 47 pro-democracy advocates of Hong Kong charged with conspiracy to commit subversion under the Hong Kong national security law.

On 6 January 2021, 54 activists, former legislators, social workers and academics were arrested by the National Security Department of the Hong Kong Police Force under the national security law over their organisation and participation in the primaries for the subsequently postponed Legislative Council election, including six organisers and 48 participants, of which two were arrested in jail, making it the largest crackdown under the national security law since its passage on 30June 2020. Authorities also raided 72 sites including the home of jailed activist Joshua Wong, the offices of news outlets Apple Daily, Stand News and InMedia HK and polling institute Hong Kong Public Opinion Research Institute (PORI), and froze more than $200,000 in funds related to the primaries. The arrests reduced the pro-democracy camp, including its moderate wing, considerably, and targeted several prominent figures.

On 28 February, 47 opposition figures among those arrested in January were officially charged with conspiracy to commit subversion under the national security law. Their appearance in court on 1 March saw hundreds of protesters assembling outside the building, a rare act of defiance before the background of restrictions due to the national security law and the COVID-19 pandemic.

Several defence lawyers expressed their objections in court to the slow prosecutions, which contrasted with speedily pressed charges. Analysts considered the slow charges, which extended to other national security cases, to be a deliberate strategy designed to stoke fear. The case was adjourned several times; at the adjournment on 4 March 2022, the next hearing date was set as 28 April, due to the COVID-19 pandemic, at which date the defendants were told to appear again on 1 to 2 June; a higher court judge had called on the handling lower court a few days earlier to deliver a speedy trial. The defendants were subjected at times to solitary confinement.

As of 8 March 2022, only 13 of 47 defendants had been granted bail, a reflection of the stringent requirements for bail under the national security law. By early July 2021, many of the defendants had announced their retirement from politics. The trial began on 6 February 2023, and is expected to last at least 90 working days.

Background

On 11 and 12 July 2020, the pro-democracy camp, organised by legal scholar and activist Benny Tai, held a primary to select numbers of candidates for the September Legislative Council election to maximise the chance for the pro-democrats to achieve the "35+" majority in the Legislative Council to block the government's bills and pressured the government to implement the five key demands of the ongoing protests. Tai envisaged that the democrats would veto all bills in the legislature to paralyse the government, and would force the Chief Executive to dissolve the Legislative Council after the government budget was vetoed, as on the fourth and fifth stages of the "ten-step lam chau" timeline. The resignation of the Chief Executive would be forced by Article 52 of the Basic Law if the Legislative Council resulting from a by-election still did not approve the budget.

Before the primaries were held, Secretary for Constitutional and Mainland Affairs Erick Tsang warned that they might violate the new Beijing-imposed national security law, specifically its clauses prohibiting secession, subversion and collusion with foreign powers. Benny Tai refuted the claim by saying such advocacy work was in accordance with the principles of the Basic Law. He added that vetoing the budget would not constitute "seriously interfering in, disrupting, or undermining the performance of duties and functions" of the government under Article 22 of the new law because the chief executive has the power to dismiss the legislature and call a by-election.

Despite the national security law and legal threats, over 600,000 voters, including 590,000 electronic ballots and more than 20,000 paper ballots, turned out throughout the two-day vote, more than 13 per cent of the total number of registered voters and far exceeding the organisers' expected turnout of 170,000. Chief Executive Carrie Lam issued a strong warning to the candidates and organisers of the primaries, saying it was subversive for them to vow to seize control of the legislature and vote down key government proposals. "If this so-called primary election's purpose is to achieve the ultimate goal of delivering what they called '35+' [lawmakers], with the objective of objecting or resisting every policy initiative of the HKSAR government, it may fall into the category of subverting the state power – one of the four types of offences under the national security law," she said.

A spokesman for Beijing's Liaison Office in Hong Kong condemned the opposition camp for ignoring the Hong Kong government's warning of possible legal breaches and pressing ahead with the primary. It named Benny Tai as a suspect in a possible breach of the national security law by coordinating with the opposition camp to seek control of the legislature, vote down the budget, paralyse the government and subvert the state power. It also accused Tai and the opposition of aiming to take over the city's governance by staging the Hong Kong version of a "colour revolution". The Hong Kong and Macau Affairs Office (HKMAO) accused Tai of "illegally manipulating" Hong Kong's electoral system, challenging the new national security law and acting as a political agent for foreign forces.

Arrests

In the morning on 6 January 2021, the National Security Department of the Hong Kong Police Force raided 72 places, including the home of jailed activist Joshua Wong, as well as co-organisers Hong Kong Public Opinion Research Institute (PORI) and law firm Ho Tse Wai and Partners. It further demanded three news outlets Apple Daily, Stand News and InMedia HK to hand over information, and froze HK$206,000 in funds related to the election. In the operations, the police arrested 53 men and women including activists, former legislators, social workers and academics who organised or contested in the primaries across the pro-democracy spectrum on suspicion of "subversion of state power" under the national security law. They included organiser Benny Tai and jailed activist and primary candidate Joshua Wong, seven former legislators of the Democratic Party, the Hong Kong's largest opposition party including the party chairman Wu Chi-wai, veteran politicians and activists Leung Kwok-hung and Claudia Mo, and newcomers including Jeffrey Andrews, a social worker serving the city's ethnic minority community, and disability rights advocate Lee Chi-yung. American lawyer John Clancey, partner of Ho Tse Wai and Partners and treasurer of the Power for Democracy which co-ordinated the primaries, was also arrested. PORI executive director Robert Chung and his deputy Chung Kim-wah were also visited by police asked to assist with the investigation.

In the afternoon after the arrests, Steve Li Kwai-wah, Senior Superintendent of the police national security unit, met with reporters. During the briefing, he showed a timetable showing that the proposal to use strategic voting to win a majority in the Legislative Council had first emerged in March 2020, with crowdfunding, public opinion research, publicity, and holding forums to follow until June. The primary elections were held on 11 and 12 July. Without referring to Benny Tai by name, he said that the proposer of the plan had been "very determined and resourceful". He stated that such aims as in the plan amounted to subversion.

According to Secretary for Security John Lee, the arrestees were accused of "subverting state power" for holding the primaries and were suspected of attempting to gain a majority in the Legislative Council with the goal of paralysing the government. Lee also said that the primary election was organized and planned as an evidence for the "vicious plan" to "sink Hong Kong into an abyss."

All arrestees are listed as the following. All were released on bail on 7 January, except Wu Chi-wai, who was alleged to have violated bail conditions related to a separate case of unauthorized assembly. On 28 February, 47 of those were arrested again, later charged.

List of arrestees

Organisers
  Benny Tai, former associate professor of law at the University of Hong Kong
  Au Nok-hin, former member of the Legislative Council (2018–2020)
  Andrew Chiu, vice chairman of the Eastern District Council and convenor of the Power for Democracy
  Ben Chung, chairman of the Sai Kung District Council and deputy convenor of the Power for Democracy
  John Clancey, lawyer and treasurer of the Power for Democracy
  Gordon Ng, activist

Candidates

Hong Kong Island
  Tiffany Yuen, member of the Southern District Council
  Fergus Leung, member of the Central and Western District Council
  Tat Cheng, member of the Eastern District Council
  Chui Chi-kin, member of the Eastern District Council
  Clarisse Yeung, chairman of the Wan Chai District Council
  Michael Pang, member of the Southern District Council

Kowloon West
  Jimmy Sham, member of the Sha Tin District Council and former convenor of the Civil Human Rights Front
  Claudia Mo, former member of the Legislative Council (2012–2020)
  Kalvin Ho, member of the Sham Shui Po District Council
  Frankie Fung, convenor of the Peninsular Commons
  Lawrence Lau, barrister and member of the Sham Shui Po District Council
  Helena Wong, former member of the Legislative Council (2012–2020)
  Lau Chak-fung, activist
  Jeffrey Andrews, social worker

Kowloon East
  Joshua Wong, former secretary general of Demosistō
  Jeremy Tam, former member of the Legislative Council (2016–2020)
  Li Ka-tat, member of the Kwun Tong District Council
  Tam Tak-chi, vice chairman of the People Power
  Wu Chi-wai, former chairman of the Democratic Party and member of the Legislative Council (2012–2020)
  Sze Tak-loy, chairman of the Hong Kong Association for Democracy and People's Livelihood and member of the Wong Tai Sin District Council

New Territories West
  Eddie Chu, former member of the Legislative Council (2016–2020)
  Sam Cheung, member of the Tuen Mun District Council
  Wong Ji-yuet, former spokesperson of Scholarism
  Ng Kin-wai, member of the Yuen Long District Council
  Andrew Wan, member of the Kwai Tsing District Council and former member of the Legislative Council (2016–2020)
  Kwok Ka-ki, former member of the Legislative Council (2004–2008; 2012–2020)
  Carol Ng, chairwoman of the Hong Kong Confederation of Trade Unions
  Tam Hoi-pong, member of the Tsuen Wan District Council

New Territories East
  Gwyneth Ho, former journalist for Stand News
  Ventus Lau, activist
  Alvin Yeung, former leader of the Civic Party and former member of the Legislative Council (2016–2020)
  Raymond Chan, chairman of the People Power and former member of the Legislative Council (2012–2020)
  Owen Chow, activist
  Lam Cheuk-ting, member of the North District Council and former member of the Legislative Council (2016–2020)
  Gary Fan, member of the Sai Kung District Council and former member of the Legislative Council (2012–2016; 2018–2020)
  Hendrick Lui, social worker
  Leung Kwok-hung, former member of the Legislative Council (2004–2017)
  Mike Lam, businessman
  Ricky Or, member of the Sai Kung District Council
  Lee Chi-yung, spokesman for the Association of Parents of the Severely Mentally Handicapped

District Council (Second)
  Kwong Chun-yu, member of the Yuen Long District Council and former member of the Legislative Council (2016–2020)
  Lester Shum, member of the Tsuen Wan District Council
  Wong Pak-yu, member of the Yuen Long District Council
  James To, member of the Yau Tsim Mong District Council and former member of the Legislative Council (1998–2020)
  Lee Yue-shun, member of the Eastern District Council

Health Services
  Winnie Yu, chairperson of the Hospital Authority Employees Alliance
  Michael Lau, officer of the Hong Kong Allied Health Professionals and Nurse Association
  Joseph Lee, former member of the Legislative Council (2004–2020)
  Yuen Wai-kit, principal of the School of Nursing of the Union Hospital

Responses

Hong Kong

Hong Kong government 

On the day of the arrests, Secretary for Security John Lee said at the Legislative Council that the ten-step lam chau timeline that Benny Tai, one of the arrestees, had proposed would "result in serious damage to society as a whole, that is why police action today is necessary."

The government issued a press release stating that the arrested persons are "active elements who organize, plan, implement, or participate in the subversion of the regime" with the intent to paralyze the government, severely interfere with, obstruct, and undermine the performance of its functions, and coerce the Chinese government and the SAR government.

Ronny Tong, a member of the Executive Council, said that for the time being, he did not see that the democrats violated the national security law in the primary elections. However, he also pointed out that members' veto of all government funding to prevent the government from functioning may be "seriously interfering with the performance of government agencies' duties," and that they may violate the law.

Pro-Beijing camp 
Holden Chow, member of the Legislative Council for the largest pro-Beijing party, DAB, said in a tweet that those arrested had violated the national security law because they had a "clear aim to paralyze" the local government and were threatening to "remove the Chinese sovereignty over Hong Kong."

In an interview with the public broadcaster RTHK, Roundtable lawmaker Michael Tien said the authorities should explain what unlawful means were involved in the cases, saying that "on the surface", neither holding a primary election nor casting a vote was unlawful. He further said that he saw no way of how the arrestees could be convicted without the court interpreting the "ultimate motive as part of the [national security] bill", and opined that the national security law might need to be redrafted to more clearly reflect this interpretation.

Pro-democracy camp 

Democratic Party chairman Lo Kin-hei sharply criticised the arrests at a news conference, suggesting that the national security law was poised to become a "universal key" for the government which would lead to "white terror", adding that this was "exactly what the Hong Kong government wants to create".

Civic Party chairman Alan Leong criticised the mass arrests as he could not see why those who promised to exercise their power to veto budgets – as outlined in the Basic Law – would be considered subversive. "We know that many in Hong Kong are very disappointed. But we appeal to the people of Hong Kong not to despair," Leong said. "We should insist on speaking the truth and living in truth. There will be light in the end of the dark tunnel, and every dark night will see the dawn. So, let us stand and fight."

Three candidates for the pro-democracy primaries in exile, Nathan Law, Ted Hui, and Sunny Cheung issued a statement in the evening of 6 January, describing the mass arrest as another proof that the one country, two systems principle was lost under the authority of the Chinese Communist Party, and saw the wide spectrum of those arrested, covering almost the complete democratic camp, as clear indication that the goal of the action was to uproot it in its entirety.

Mainland China 
The Office for Safeguarding National Security and the Liaison Office of the Central People's Government both issued statements of firm support for the enforcement actions and singled out Benny Tai, with the liaison office spokesperson saying, "[We] believe that the general public can clearly see the evil intentions of Benny Tai and others, and the harm caused to Hong Kong society."

Chinese Foreign Ministry spokeswoman Hua Chunying defended the arrests, saying that they were needed to stop "external forces and individuals [colluding] to undermine China's stability and security".

Before the trial, director of the Hong Kong and Macau Affairs Office Xia Baolong singled out three pro-democracy activists charged with the national security law, Joshua Wong, Jimmy Lai and Benny Tai, saying they were "extremely wicked" and "must be severely punished for their illegal actions." Hong Kong Free Press enquired with the Department of Justice about the department's position on the remarks of Xia, given its statements that comments from third parties on ongoing court proceedings were inappropriate. The department pointed to the words "in accordance with the law" which Xia had added; it refused to elaborate on the significance of this comment in this context, and on the question of whether anyone else would be able to legally use the formulation of Xia.

United States 
U.S. Secretary of State Mike Pompeo slammed the arrests as an "outrage" and said that the U.S. would "consider sanctions and other restrictions on any and all individuals and entities involved in executing this assault on the Hong Kong people." Antony Blinken, US President-elect Joe Biden's pick for Secretary of State, said the arrests was "an assault on those bravely advocating for universal rights" launched by the Chinese authorities. "The Biden-Harris administration will stand with the people of Hong Kong and against Beijing's crackdown on democracy," he said.

The U.S. imposed sanctions on six officials on 15 January including Hong Kong delegate to the National People's Congress Standing Committee Tam Yiu-chung, vice-chairman of the Central Leading Group on Hong Kong and Macau Affairs You Quan, deputy director of the Office for Safeguarding National Security Sun Wenqing and three officials in the National Security Division of the Hong Kong Police Frederic Choi Chin-pang, Kelvin Kong Hok-lai and Andrew Kan Kai-yan, over the mass arrests.

United Kingdom 
British Foreign Secretary Dominic Raab called the arrests "a grievous attack on Hong Kong's rights and freedoms as protected under the Joint Declaration" and reiterated the UK's offer to the British National (Overseas) passport holders to emigrate Britain. "The UK will not turn our backs on the people of Hong Kong and will continue to offer BNOs the right to live and work in the UK," Raab said.

The last British Governor of Hong Kong Chris Patten urged the European Union not to go ahead with the draft investment deal with China. "If this deal goes ahead it will make a mockery of Europe's ambitions to be taken seriously as a global political and economic player. It spits in the face of human rights and shows a delusional view of the Chinese Communist Party's trustworthiness on the international stage."

European Union 
The European Union called for the immediate release of the arrestees. "We are currently analysing the situation to see how we might need to react. There are other possibilities open to us, sanctions for example," the European Commission spokesperson Peter Stano said. The German Foreign Ministry called the arrests "another milestone in a worrying development in recent months." The arrests confirmed fears that the security law "is leading to an erosion of civil liberties and the rule of law".

The European Parliament on 21 January adopted a resolution by 597 votes in favor, 17 against and 61 abstentions on the deteriorating human rights situation in Hong Kong and urged EU countries to consider introducing sanctions against Hong Kong and Chinese officials including Carrie Lam, under the EU Human Rights Global Sanction Regime. The Parliament also regretted the EU's decision to enter the EU-China Comprehensive Agreement on Investment by risking its credibility as a global human rights actor.

Taiwan 
Taiwanese President Tsai Ing-wen condemned the arrests and called on "the world's democracies to speak out against China's political repression in the territory." She vowed that Taiwan will "continue to resolutely support a free Hong Kong and stand up for our shared democratic values." Taiwan's Foreign Minister Joseph Wu described the arrests in Hong Kong as a "deep shock to those who treasure freedom" and called on the world to "unite against authoritarianism."

Japan 
The government of Japan stated that it could not tolerate the mass arrests in Hong Kong, and would convey this position to China and join hands with foreign countries to deal with the Hong Kong issue. It continued to point out that after the implementation of the national security law, it had deep doubts about whether Hong Kong respects basic values such as freedom of speech and freedom of the press. Ruling party LDP lawmaker Keisuke Suzuki said that the current situation in Hong Kong was serious and it was at a critical juncture. He emphasized that the international community must regard the actions of the Hong Kong government as a violation of international agreements. He also describes the nature of the Chinese Communist Party is to deny universal values such as freedom, democracy and human rights.

Others 
Maya Wang of the Human Rights Watch issued a statement condemning the arrests, saying that "Beijing once again has failed to learn from its mistakes in Hong Kong: that repression generates resistance, and that millions of Hong Kong people will persist in their struggle for their right to vote and run for office in a democratically elected government."

Bail hearings 
On 28 February 2021, of the 55 pro-democracy figures initially arrested in January, 47 were officially charged with conspiracy to commit subversion under the national security law. They were denied bail and instead remained in detention before trial on 1 March, while Jeffrey Andrews, Lee Chi-yung, Kwong Chun-yu, James To, Michael Lau, Joseph Lee, Yuen Wai-kit and John Clancey were released on bail. Pro-democracy group Power for Democracy which co-organised the primaries announced its disbandment a day earlier on 27 February.

Marathon hearing

Day 1 

The trial began on 1 March at the West Kowloon Magistrates' Court. About 1,000 supporters gathered at the court, most wearing black to express solidarity with the detainees, and some holding banners calling for the release of the "political prisoners" and chanting "Liberate Hong Kong, revolution of our times", "Fight for freedom, stand with Hong Kong" and "", slogans which were deemed illegal under the national security law, making it one of the largest rallies since the COVID-19 outbreak. Foreign diplomats joined the crowds queuing for one of the about 100 seats inside the courtroom. The police set up security lines around the court in the afternoon and forced demonstrators to disperse.

The prosecution applied to postpone the hearing until 31 May as its investigations had not finished. Alan Leong, representing the defence, questioned the police for "rushing" to press charges without finishing the investigations, some five weeks earlier than originally scheduled. Traditionally, Hong Kong's common law system put the onus on the prosecution to prove its case for objecting bail, but under the national security law the defendants instead needed to prove to the court that they would not be a national security threat if released on bail. Due to the large number of defendants being trialed at the same time, the trial dragged on for close to 14 hours until almost 3 a.m., resulted in four defendants being hospitalised due to exhaustion. Leo Yau, one of the defence solicitors for nine of the defendants, was arrested by the police when he attempted to pass a police cordon to get into the courtroom.

Day 2 

The second day of the trial resumed late on the next morning, giving defendants little time to rest. Defense lawyers voiced criticism of the court over defendants not being given the opportunity to shower or change clothes for four days since they were detained on 28 February. One of the defendants, Lawrence Lau, 53, also a practicing barrister, apologized for not bathing for three days before addressing the court. He added: "When someone is stripped of their freedom, they are also stripped of their personal hygiene and appearance, which makes them lose confidence. I do not understand why I ended up in custody when I have been law-abiding my whole life." A defence counsel also told the court that his defendants had not been sent back to the Lai Chi Kok Reception Centre until nearly 7 a.m. on 2 March. "The defendants have to attend court hearings that started at 8 this morning [yesterday], which means they could only rest for at most two hours, causing them to be physically tormented," he said. Amnesty International Hong Kong program manager Lam Cho Ming warned that an extended hearing "along with insufficient time to rest could potentially violate the right to a fair trial." Chief magistrate Victor So called a halt to the second day of hearings at 10:36 p.m. on 2 March.

Another defendant, Winnie Yu, 33, a nurse and chairwoman of the Hospital Authority Employees Alliance, was suspended from her duties by the Hong Kong Hospital Authority after she was prosecuted.

Day 3 
 
Eight defendants had not addressed the court regarding their bail applications in the more than 24-hour marathon hearing. On the third day on 3 March 47 pro-democracy defendants have yet to submit their statements on bail. Before the trial started at 12 pm, the live broadcast system showed the problem of not being able to hear the conversation or voice in the court again, causing the family members to question the "secret interrogation." On the other hand, the live broadcasts in the press room and the auditorium both had problems with pictures and no sound, which caused the reporters on the spot to clamor. Barrister Margaret Ng said that the court has no way to control its own procedures, as she questioned the judicial independence. However, Kit Hung, the senior news director of the Judiciary, stated that no in-court voices will be played before the court session. This statement caused dissatisfaction with Figo Chan, the convener of Civil Human Rights Front.

At the same time, four Civic Party defendants Alvin Yeung, Kwok Ka-ki, Jeremy Tam and Lee Yue-shun announced their resignations from the party, with Yeung resigning from the party. Barrister Alan Leong, chairman of the party, terminated his legal representation of the four. Lam Cheuk-ting, Clarisse Yeung and Gwyneth Ho also told the court they had terminated the services of their legal representatives. Alvin Yeung said before addressing the court: "As a barrister, I would never have imagined that I would have to address the court in the docks. On March 2 five years ago, I was sworn in as a legislative councillor, fighting for Hongkongers, but five years later, I am fighting for my own freedom." Chief Magistrate Victor So adjourned the third day proceedings at 8:30 pm.

Day 4 

All defendants finished their addresses to the court with proceedings deep into the fourth day on 4 March. Hundreds of people queued in the rain for entering the courthouse before the proceedings until nighttime, defying police warnings of violating the national security law.

Some media outlets applied to the court for lifting reporting strict restrictions on the bail proceedings which could only report the name of the court and the magistrate of the case, the date and place of the proceedings, the name of the defendants and their legal representation, the offence they were charged of and the result of a proceedings. The defence proposed a set of relaxed reporting rules, with Barrister David Ma saying that an open, fair and transparent trial was the "cornerstone of the rule of law", pointing out that freedom of speech and the press are respected under the national security law. A representative of Senior Counsel Hectar Pun argued that "if the media cannot report on this open hearing, then it will undermine the principle of open justice." Chief Magistrate Victor So refused the plea on the grounds that the general public or the press may not be able to determine whether a statement made in court fell under the scope of "legal argument," causing citizens to accidentally breach the restrictions, which would be "a bit dangerous for them".

Chief Magistrate Victor So initially granted bail to 15 of the 47 defendants at around 8 pm, but the decision was immediately appealed by the Department of Justice. The 32 remaining defendants were denied bail on grounds that they would be likely to continue to commit acts endangering national security, meaning they would have to be remain in detention until the trial begins on 31 May. When the defendants left the court, the supporters who waited outside waved goodbye and thanked their lawyers. Some also chanted "Five demands, not one less", "Political prisoners are not guilty" and "Hongkonger won't die!"

Other hearings 
The hearings on the case resumed on 31 May 2021. The court postponed further proceedings until 8 July. Until 28 June, defendants in the case will be presented with evidence and allowed to enter a plea, otherwise, their case will be moved to the High Court, where some analysts say, could consider harsher sentences than lower courts.

The hearings were further delayed for several times without clear trial date by judges following a request by prosecution, which had asked for more time to prepare the case. The prosecution sought to transfer it to a higher court with powers to order longer jail sentences. A High Court judge, in April 2022, called for a speedy trial in the lower court, and also revealed that 11 defendants intended to plead guilty when the case was officially committed to the High Court.

On 1 June, Chief Magistrate Peter Law in the West Kowloon Court ruled that 17 defendants will be transferred to the High Court for trial. A further 27 defendants were committed to the High Court on 2 June. Two more were transferred on 6 June, and the final defendant, Gordon Ng, who requested for a committal proceedings, was transferred on 6 July.

Bail appeals

Amongst the 47 defendants, bail of 15 were appealed by the prosecution. By 15 March, judge Victor So ruled in favour of the prosecution over four (Jeremy Tam, Sam Cheung, Ng Kin-wai, Kwok Ka-ki), seven were bailed out by the court, while Clarisse Yeung, Lawrence Lau, Hendrick Lui and Mike Lam were also released on bail after prosecutors dropped the appeal.

Of the 21 defendants presented to the courts on the next day on 12 March, Judge Victor So, who was the magistrate who granted the appeals in the first place, rejected 11 appeal applications on 12 March, while the ten remaining defendants withdrew their applications. Other bail appeals were mainly handled by High Court judge Esther Toh.

Bailed out (13) 

 Helena Wong: approved on 11 March; Wong, after release, reunited with her husband and said: "I was really calm while I was in custody, as I know I did nothing wrong, but the bail hearing was really tiring in the first few days."
 Clarisse Yeung: approved on 12 March after appeal dropped by prosecution.
 Mike Lam: approved on 12 March after appeal dropped by prosecution.
 Lawrence Lau: approved on 12 March after appeal dropped by prosecution.
 Hendrick Lui: approved on 12 March after appeal dropped by prosecution.
 Tat Cheng: approved on 13 March.
 Michael Pang: approved on 13 March.
 Ricky Or: approved on 13 March.
 Kalvin Ho: approved on 14 March.
 Sze Tak-loy: approved on 14 March, for serving the community as district councillors and cooperating with various government departments.
 Lee Yue-shun: approved on 14 March, for serving the community as district councillors and cooperating with various government departments.
 Raymond Chan: approved on 16 September, for cooperating with the government as MP by supporting some government bills, and having been named by LegCo president Andrew Leung as the most diligent lawmaker.
 Wong Ji-yuet: approved on 21 December, to finish her bachelor's degree, and she had not explicitly advocated for international sanctions against the authorities, and for Hong Kong independence, during the primaries.

Remanded (34) 
 Ng Kin-wai: denied on 11 March 2021; denied on 6 June 2022, for clear determination to promote Hong Kong independence.
 Jeremy Tam: denied on 13 March; denied on 22 April for signing a letter in September 2019 supporting the Hong Kong Human Rights and Democracy Act.
 Sam Cheung: denied on 14 March; denied on 9 April for "determined and resolute" in his contribution to the democrats' scheme.
 Leung Kwok-hung: denied on 29 March; denied on 13 May for resolute in his position against the government and the national security law and that his risk of reoffending was high due to international support.
 Ben Chung: denied on 31 March for seeking of crowdfunding, alleged to be part of a money laundering scheme, and his pivotal role in the defunct organization Power for Democracy; denied on 1 June.
 Kwok Ka-ki: denied on 13 March; denied on 9 April for inviting U.S. interference on Hong Kong affairs.
 Jimmy Sham: denied on 12 April; denied on 13 May for being a "determined and resolute young man" who had vowed to continue to push for the government to give in to the protesters five demands and that he was at risk of reoffending if granted bail.
 Claudia Mo: denied on 14 April; denied on 28 May for her exchanges on WhatsApp with Western media were a "threat to national security". 
 Chui Chi-kin: denied on 22 April for causing fear and inciting hatred against the government by uploading a video on his YouTube channel which appeared to show a large contingent of People's Liberation Army military vehicles crossing into Hong Kong from Mainland China.
 Andrew Wan: denied on 28 May citing the contents on his computer that advocated for Hong Kong independence, and the formation of a group which called for international sanctions against Hong Kong officials who allegedly permitted "excessive police violence". This, the court argued, demonstrated a "persistent and strong devotion" to the agenda of subversion and secession.
 Henry Wong: denied on 1 June; denied on 1 September for his active participation of international front, which is calling for sanctions against Hong Kong and Chinese government officials.
 Gary Fan: denied on 1 June; denied on 8 September, for being a "determined and resolute man" who had vowed to continue to push for the authorities to give in to the protesters' five demands and he had called for all parties to act together in opposing the government. 
 Gordon Ng: denied on 1 June; denied on 14 September 2022.
 Andrew Chiu: denied on 1 June.
 Nathan Lau: denied on 1 June.
 Roy Tam: denied on 23 August, citing on the election campaign speech of his stance against the Hong Kong government, police and the national security law. In addition, he is also calling for international sanctions against Hong Kong officials and senior police officers on his Facebook page, although he removed his account after promulgation of national security law.
 Gwyneth Ho: withdrew bail application on 8 September after request to lift reporting restrictions was rejected by Toh. Ho was represented by Douglas Kwok after the original representing barrister Chow Hang-tung was arrested that day.
 Frankie Fung: denied on 4 November, for showing himself to be persistent in promoting and spreading subversive ideologies due to his media outlet that he co-funded, which is serving as a platform to promote seditious ideologies and calling for international sanctions against Hong Kong and Chinese officials. 
 Carol Ng: denied on 20 December, for having an international influence as a result of her trade union work and having called for resistance against the authorities after losing the primary election and shown determination to resist against the government.
 Lam Cheuk-ting: denied on 13 May 2022, for using his Patreon account to enhance international lobbying and resistance against the government and having a strong political influence due to his stance on lobby for sanctions.

Special cases 

 Wu Chi-wai: emergency application approved on 7 May to attend the funeral of his 92-year-old father after the denial of his initial request by the correctional department sparked wide criticism. Remanded in custody before and after the temporary bail.
 Owen Chow: approved on 22 June to enable Chow to finish his nursing degree, and he had not explicitly called for Hong Kong independence during the primaries; re-arrested on 12 January 2022 and bail revoked following a court ruling that he had broken his bail conditions and endangered national security through online postings of an inciteful nature which related to the 2019 Prince Edward station attack and the 2019 Yuen Long attack.
 Winnie Yu: denied on 1 June; approved on 28 July after observing in her written explanation that there was no evidence that Yu ever had an international connection; re-arrested on 7 March and bail revoked for breaking bail conditions.

Pre-trial events 
On 16 August 2022, Secretary for Justice, Paul Lam, said that the case has decided to be handled without a jury, citing the "involvement of foreign elements", "personal safety of jurors and their family members", and a "risk of perverting the course of justice if the trial is conducted with a jury".

On 18 August 2022, authorities in Hong Kong said that 29 defendants had entered guilty pleas in court; the pleas had been entered earlier but the announcement was only made on that day, after reporting restrictions had been lifted. In November, Ng Kin-wai changed his mind and indicated that he also would plead guilty. On 11 January 2023, a panel of three judges ruled that those who had pleaded guilty would be sentenced only after the trial of the 17 who had pleaded not guilty. On 17 January, Mike Lam indicated through his lawyer that he would plead guilty.

Trial 

The trial for Hong Kong 47 is expected to run for 90 days, and began on 6 February 2023, nearly two years after the arrest.

League of Social Democrats, one of the last active pro-democracy groups, organised a small protest under a heavy police presence, decrying the crackdown as "shameless" and calling for the release of all political prisoners. Representatives from eleven countries including the UK and the US, along with the European Union were also among those queueing up.

The trial opened with the court reading out the charge and formally taking pleas from 18 defendants in front of three national security judges – Andrew Chan, Johnny Chan and Alex Lee. All 18 repeated that they would plead not guilty except Ng Kin-wai and Mike Lam, both changed their mind earlier.

Prosecutors told the West Kowloon Magistrates Court that the accused had conspired to seriously interfere, disrupt or undermine the duties and functions of the Hong Kong government, "with a view to subverting the state power". An amended filing revealed the prosecution had dropped one accusation that the group intended to use "the threat of force", a change noted in court by Gwyneth Ho, one of the defendants. Leung Kwok-hung, on the other hand, said in court that there was "no crime to admit" and that “it is not a crime to act against a totalitarian regime”.

Prosecutor Anthony Chau said that if the elections were not delayed due to COVID-19, the alleged conspiracy would have been "carried out to fruition."

On the second day of the trial, a video was played in courtroom showing a closed-door meeting held in May 2020, attended by Benny Tai and other democrats, in which Tai suggested launching the primary election and other details of the plan. As the footage was shaky and shot below a table, with the camera pointing towards Tai from time to time, questions arise over who recorded the video. Points Media, formed by overseas Hongkongers, identified Kim Chan, once joined pro-Beijing party DAB, as the recorder. Chan's attendance in the meeting was confirmed by ex-District Councillor Michael Mo.

Witnesses for prosecution 

The court also heard that four people who are to plead guilty, Au Nok-hin, Mike Lam, Andrew Chiu, Ben Chung, will give evidence as witnesses for the prosecution. Those who have pleaded guilty will not be sentenced until after the trial.

Au started testifying against fellow democrats on 6th day of trial, revealing the plan for primaries first floated in January 2020, in which Tai labelled a majority in the Legislative Council as a "constitutional weapon of mass destruction". Au also named a number of participants in various meetings, and how others reacted differently to Tai's plan.

Paid court goers 
Hundreds of people had lined up outside the court before the start, vying for tickets allocated for the public to sit in the main court room. Some of those waiting said they did not know what case they were waiting for, while some filmed journalists. A group of women who had obtained tickets were later seen leaving before the hearing commenced.

Hong Kong Free Press noted that some people who waited in line to attend the trial were potentially paid, and did not attend the trial after receiving a ticket. A family member of a defendant said "It is obvious that someone is trying to stop the general public from observing the case." InMedia reporters, operating undercover, were paid HK$800 to spend the night queuing for tickets; multiple groups, some with pro-government links, were suspected to be coordinating payments to people to queue and obtain tickets.

See also 
 2020 Hong Kong Legislative Council mass resignations
 2021 Hong Kong electoral reform
 Chicago Seven
 Kaohsiung Incident

References 

2019–2020 Hong Kong protests
2020s trials
2021 in law
2021 in Hong Kong
2021 Hong Kong legislative election

Political repression in Hong Kong